Ignatia Broker (1919–1987) was an Ojibwe writer and community leader from Minneapolis, Minnesota. She is best known for the novel Night Flying Woman, published in 1983, which tells the story of Broker's great-great-grandmother and her family's life before and after contact with white explorers. She was an enrolled member of the Ojibwe tribe and the Ottertail Pillager Band.

Early and personal life 
Broker was born on February 14, 1919, on White Earth Indian Reservation in northwestern Minnesota. She received her early education at Wahpeton Indian School in North Dakota, a federal Indian boarding school, and Haskell Institute in Kansas. In 1941 she moved to Minneapolis, Minnesota. There, she attended night classes and worked at a defense plant during World War II. She later described the war years as "unstable" and wrote about the racial discrimination the Ojibwe community in Minneapolis faced. After the war, she met and married a veteran. They had two children together, and lived in St. Paul, Minnesota. Broker's husband went back into military service, and died in the Korean War. The death of her husband together with the discrimination she often faced, Broker wrote, prompted her to become involved with various Native American social advocacy groups, including the American Indian Center of Minneapolis.

Work 
Night Flying Woman, Broker's only novel, was published in 1983. In the preface, Broker writes that her motivation for the novel came partly from her own children, who wished to know more about the past experiences of the Ojibwe people. The theme of keeping the past alive through passing down stories in the oral tradition is important in the book. After opening the book with some details of Broker's own life, the story mostly focuses on the experiences of Broker's great-great-grandmother, Ni-bo-wi-se-gwa, or Oona, who lived from the 1860s to the 1940s. During that time, cultural contact with Euro-American society created various devastating changes, including removal from her tribe's traditional lands to the White Earth Indian Reservation, and the introduction of guns, alcohol, steel, missionaries, and smallpox, among many other alterations to traditional life. The book was considered notable, since the story was related by an Ojibwe storyteller and not a white historian.

Death 
Broker died of lung cancer on June 23, 1987.

Awards 
1984 Wonder Woman Award

References

Further reading

External links
 Ignatia Broker from Voices in the Gaps
 Ann Kaplan Interview with Ignatia Broker - Minnesota Historical Society

1919 births
1987 deaths
Native American writers
20th-century American novelists
20th-century American women writers
American women novelists
Novelists from Minnesota
Haskell Indian Nations University alumni
20th-century Native American women
20th-century Native Americans